Abdul Ghani Lone (6 May 1932 – 21 May 2002) was a Kashmiri lawyer, politician and a separatist leader.

Life
Lone was born in Dard Harie, Kralpora in the Kupwara District of the princely state of Kashmir and Jammu in British India into a Kashmiri Muslim family. He earned a law degree from Aligarh Muslim University in 1957.

His sons Bilal Lone & Sajjad Lone are Kashmiri politicians. Sajjad Lone was member of the Legislative Assembly. His daughter Shabnam Gani Lone is a lawyer at the Supreme Court of India.

Career 

He made his entry into politics serving in the state assembly as a Congress candidate in 1967. In 1978, he formed a Kashmiri separatist organization called People's Conference dedicated to "the restoration of 'internal autonomy' in Kashmir."

Assassination

He was assassinated on 21 May 2002 while commemorating the twelfth anniversary of the death of Kashmiri leader, Mirwaiz Maulvi Farooq. Eyewitnesses said that earlier in the day a group of youths arrived at the Idgah, shouting pro-Pakistan slogans, and two of them fired on Lone.

Jammu and Kashmir Chief Minister Farooq Abdullah expressed sorrow over the killing of Lone and held Pakistan responsible for the episode, saying, "Pakistan wants Kashmir and so is desperate in its action, which this killing has proved." Then Prime Minister of India Atal Bihari Vajpayee said, "Mr. Lone was assassinated because he was working for peace in Jammu and Kashmir."

His son Sajjad Lone accused separatist leader Syed Ali Shah Geelani and Pakistani spy agency ISI of being responsible for his father's death, but he later altered his accusation, reportedly at the suggestion of his mother,  blaming Abdullah for providing inadequate security to his father.

The United States condemned the assassination, with Secretary of State Colin Powell issuing a statement recognizing Lone as moderate who sought a peaceful resolution of the Kashmir issue.

See also
 List of assassinated Indian politicians

References

External links
Milli Gazette

1932 births
2002 deaths
Assassinated Indian politicians
Aligarh Muslim University alumni
Kashmiri people
Kashmiri Muslims
People murdered in Jammu and Kashmir
People from Kupwara district
Kashmir separatist movement
Jammu and Kashmir MLAs 1967–1972
Jammu and Kashmir People's Conference politicians
2002 murders in India